Robert Wexler (born 1961) is an American politician.

Robert Wexler may also refer to:

Robert Wexler (rabbi), American university president
Robert Freeman Wexler (born 1961), American writer